Solina may refer to:

Places
Solina, Poland, a village
Gmina Solina, an administrative district in Poland
Lake Solina in Poland
Solina Dam  in Poland
Solina, Tuzla, a part of city Tuzla in Bosnia and Herzegovina

People
Solina Chau (born c. 1961), a businesswoman in Hong Kong
Solina Nyirahabimana, a Rwandan diplomat and politician
Franc Solina, a Slovenian computer scientist and university professor

Other
ARP String Ensemble, a polyphonic multi-orchestral synthesizer 
Antiblemma solina, a moth